Enterovibrio coralii is a bacterium species from the genus of Enterovibrio.

References 

Vibrionales
Bacteria described in 2005